Choi Won-tae (born 11 November 1967) is a South Korean archer. He competed in the men's individual event at the 1984 Summer Olympics.

References

1967 births
Living people
South Korean male archers
Olympic archers of South Korea
Archers at the 1984 Summer Olympics
Place of birth missing (living people)
20th-century South Korean people